Spondiadoideae is a plant subfamily in the cashew and sumac family Anacardiaceae.

Genera
The following genera are recognised:

References

Anacardiaceae
Rosid subfamilies